Rosa Matzkin is an economist who is the Charles E. Davidson Professor of Economics at the University of California, Los Angeles. In 2018 Matzkin was awarded membership to the American Academy of Arts and Sciences. She works in the fields of econometrics and microeconomic theory, including panel data models and the study of economic decision-making.

Education
Rosa Matzkin received her Bachelor in Science from Israel Institute of Technology in 1981. Matzkin continued her education at the University of Minnesota where she received her Ph.D. in 1986.

Work
Rosa Matzkin currently works at The University of California, Los Angeles where she is a professor of economics. Prior to her work at UCLA, Matzkin worked at Northwestern University and Yale University. She also had temporary positions at Caltech, University of Chicago, Massachusetts Institute of Technology, and University of Wisconsin.

References

Fellows of the American Academy of Arts and Sciences
Fellows of the Econometric Society
American women economists
20th-century American economists
21st-century American economists
University of California, Los Angeles faculty
University of Minnesota alumni
California Institute of Technology faculty
University of Chicago faculty
Massachusetts Institute of Technology faculty
University of Wisconsin–Madison faculty
Year of birth missing (living people)
Living people
20th-century American women
21st-century American women